The 2012 Nigeria Entertainment Awards was the 7th edition of the ceremony. The event was held on September 2, 2012 at the Skirball Center for the Performing Arts, New York City. The event was hosted by Funke Akindele and Ayo Makun. Winners included Wizkid, Davido, Don Jazzy and Tineh Tempah.

Awards

Music categories
 Best Album of the Year
 Soul is Heavy - Nneka (singer)
 ELI - Ice Prince
 Superstar - Wizkid
 The Dreamer- SDC
 Beautiful Noise - Timi Dakolo
 Super Sun - Bez (musician)

 Hottest Single of the Year
 "Ara" - Brymo
 "Oliver Twist" - D'banj
 "Pakurumo" - Wizkid
 "Damiduro" - Davido
 "Chop my Money" - P-Square
 "Roll" - Rayce

 Best New Act of the Year
 Tiwa Savage
 Brymo
 Davido
 Bez
 May D
 Chidinma

 Gospel Artist/Group of the Year
 Sugun Obe
 Tim Godfrey
 Eben
 Kore
 Lara George
 Vivien Stephen

 Best Pop/R&B Artist of the Year
Chidinma
Omawumi
 Waje
 Tiwa Savage
 Wizkid
 Capital Femi

 Best Rap Act of the Year
 Sauce Kid
 Ice Prince
 Vector
 Eva Alordiah
 M.I
 SDC

 Best Music Producer of the Year
 Jesse Jagz
 Don Jazzy
 Shizzy
 Cobhams Asuquo
 Sarz
 Samklef

 Best International Artist
 2Kriss
 Kadija Kamara
 Tinie Tempah
 Skepta
 Abiade
 Tipsy

 Best Music Video of the Year
 "Ara" - Brymo (Aje Filmworks)
 "Nawti" - Olu Maintain (Kehinde Naomi & Team Nawti)
 "She likes It" - Cap B (Adeola Alao)
 "My Home" - Nneka (Andy Amadi Okorafor)
 "Tete Lo Bere" - Jahbless (DJ Tee)
 "Pakurumo" - Wizkid (Clarence Peters)

 Most Promising Act to Watch
 Eva Alordiah
 Chukky K
 Praiz
 Aires
 Flowssick
 Yung6ix
 Dammy Krane
 Eddie Kim

 Pan African Artist or Group of the Year
 HHP
 Sarkodie
 Vivian Ndoyr
 Cabo Snoop
 Donaeo
 Noni Zondi

 Best US based Artist of the Year
 Hoodbilli
 Bolade
 Awon Boyz
 Tolumide
 Duncan Daniels
 Jay Cube

 Best Indigenous Artist/Group
 Timaya
 Flavour N'abania
 Aduke
 9ice
 Bracket
 Jahbless

 Best Collabo of the Year
 Sheyman Ft eLDee / Skales - "My Money remix"
 Saucekid ft Davido ("Carolina")
 Brackett ft Wizkid ("Girl")
 Bez ft Praiz ("That Stupid Song")
 Jeru ft Wizkid ("Familiarity")
 Ikechukwu ft Xela ("Bu Lie Oto")

Film categories
  Best Actor in a Film
 Wale Ojo (Phone Swap)
 Joseph Benjamin (actor) (Mr. and Mrs.)
 Chet Anekwe (Unwanted Guest)
 Hakeem Kae Kazim (Man on Ground)
 Ramsey Noah (Memories of my Heart)
 Pascal Atuma (Who is the Man)

 Best Actress in a Film
 Uche Jombo (Damaged)
 Nse Ikpe Etim (Mr. and Mrs.)
 Funke Akindele (The Return of Jenifa)
 Tonto Dike (Private Enemy)
 Rita Dominic (Shattered (2011 film))
 Omotola Jalade Ekeinde (Ties That Bind)

 Best Film Director
 Kunle Afolayan (Phone Swap)
 Tade Ogidan (Family on Fire)
 Tunde Kelani (Maami)
 Daniel Ademinokan (Unwanted Guest)
 Leila Djansi (Ties That Bind)
 Akin Omotoso (Man on Ground)

 Best Picture
 The Young Smoker
 Inside Story
 Phone Swap
 Ties That Bind
 The Return of Jenifa
 Unwanted Guest

 Best TV Show
 Nigerian Idol
 Jacob's Cross
 Tinsel
 Naija Sings
 City Sistas
 Big Brother Africa

 Pan African Actor
 Kevin Ndege Mamboleo (Inside Story)
 Majid Michel (Somewhere in Africa)
 Van Vicker (Paparazzi)
 Chris Attoh (6 hours to Christmas)
 Edward Kagutuzi (The Mirror Boy)
 John Dumelo (Ties That Bind)

 PAn African Actress
 Ama K. Abebrese (Ties That Bind)
 Yvonne Okoro (Single Six)
 Juliet Ibrahim (Crazy Scandal)
 Kudzai Sevenzo (Playing Warriors)
 Jokate Mwegelo (Chumo)
 Millicent Makheido (48)

Other categories
 World DJ
 DJ Humility
 DJ Xclusive
 DJ Abass
 DJ Neptune
 DJ Jimmy Jatt
 DJ Mixmaster Brown
 DJ Flava
 DJ Dee Money

 Best Comedian
 Seyi Law
 AY
 Julius Agwu
 Tee A
 Basketmouth
 Ali Baba

 Best Entertainment Personality
 Dbanj
 eLDee
 Tonto Dike
 Genevieve Nnaji
 Funke Akindele
 2Face Idibia
 Banky W
 Uti Nwachukwu

 Entertainment Promoter
 Big Moose Ent
 Flytime TV
 Town Kries
 Industry Nite
 Cokobar
 Tiwaworks
 Posh Hill Ent
 Dejavu

 Media Personality
 Toolz - The Beat 99.9 FM
 Adam - Sound City TV
 Freeze - Cool FM 96.9 FM
 Dolapo Oni - Mnet
 Uduak Uduok - Ladybrille
 Denrele - Channel O Africa

 Entertainment Executive
 Audu Maikori
 eLDee
 Segun Demuren
 Efe Omoregie
 Obi Asika
 Ayo Shonaiya

References

Nigeria Entertainment Awards
Nigeria Entertainment Awards
Ent 
Ent
Nigeria Entertainment Awards
Nigeria Entertainment Awards
Nigeria Entertainment Awards